Netechma polycornuta is a species of moth of the family Tortricidae. It is found in Pichincha Province, Ecuador.

The wingspan is 18 mm. The ground colour of the forewings is cream with weak golden shades and pale ferruginous suffusions along the median cell and subapically. The hindwings are white cream with greyer strigulation (fine streaks).

Etymology
The species name refers to high number of cornuti and is derived from Greek poly (meaning numerous).

References

Moths described in 2008
Netechma